Maull House, also known as the Thomas Maull House, is a historic home located at Lewes, Sussex County, Delaware. It dates to about 1730, and is a -story, with attic, cypress sheathed frame dwelling with a gambrel roof. It measures 30 feet by 16 feet. A rear wing was added about 1890. It is the oldest Lewes building in its original location and with the least alterations.  Adjacent to the house is a section of the Lewes and Rehoboth Canal where a dock for the pilots' boats would have been. In 1803, Jérôme Bonaparte and his bride, Betsy Patterson, were shipwrecked off Lewes and entertained at the Maull House.  Joseph Maull (1781-1846) served as Governor of Delaware from March 2, 1846, until his death on May 3, 1846.  The house remained in the Maull family until 1957, and was obtained by the Colonel David Hall Chapter, National Society Daughters of the American Revolution, in 1962.

It was added to the National Register of Historic Places in 1970, with a boundary increase in 1978.

References

External links

Houses on the National Register of Historic Places in Delaware
Houses completed in 1730
Houses in Lewes, Delaware
Historic American Buildings Survey in Delaware
National Register of Historic Places in Sussex County, Delaware